The Heidelberg tramway network is a network of tramways forming an important element of the public transport system in Heidelberg, a city in the federal state of Baden-Württemberg, Germany. Opened in 1885, the network has been operated since 2009 by Rhein-Neckar-Verkehr (RNV) within the Verkehrsverbund Rhein-Neckar (VRN). The network includes line 5 of the Mannheim/Ludwigshafen tram system, which is connected with Heidelberg’s tram system via the Upper Rhine Railway Company (Oberrheinische Eisenbahn-Gesellschaft, OEG).

Lines 
, the Heidelberg tramway network had the following lines:

See also
List of town tramway systems in Germany
Trams in Germany

References

 Basten, Robert; Jeanmaire, Claude (1986). Heidelberger Strassenbahnen. Villingen (Schweiz),  

 Muth, Frank (2003). Straßenbahnen in Heidelberg. München,  
 Röth, Helmut (2006). Auf Schienen zwischen Odenwald und Pfalz. Fotografien 1955–1976. Ludwigshafen am Rhein, Verlag Pro Message. . 
 Verkehrsverbund Rhein-Neckar (Hrsg.) (2004). An einem Strang. Eisenbahngeschichte im Rhein-Neckar-Dreieck. Ludwigshafen, Verlag Pro Message.

External links

 Rhein-Neckar-Verkehr 
 Verkehrsverbund Rhein-Neckar 
 
 
 

Transport in Heidelberg
Heidelberg
Transport in Baden-Württemberg
Metre gauge railways in Germany
Heidelberg